Live at the Greek: Excess All Areas is a double live album by Jimmy Page and the Black Crowes, released by musicmaker.com on 29 February 2000 and reissued by TVT Records on 4 July 2000.

In October 1999, Page teamed up with the Crowes for a two-night performance of material from the Led Zeppelin catalogue and old blues and rock standards. "I didn't really have that much fun doing it," grumbled singer Chris Robinson. "It was alright, and Jimmy's a phenomenal guitarist, but to me it was just a job. I'm not a big fan of Robert Plant's lyrics or his singing, so that part of it was a little boring for me."

Contractual problems with their record company prevented the Crowes issuing any of their own songs played at the Greek shows. Also featuring Page with the band, these included "Wiser Time", "No Speak No Slave", "Remedy", and "Hard to Handle".

The double CD released in 2000 featured a different running order, an extra song, an enhanced QuickTime video and photographs taken during the concert. The Japanese version of the album adds "Misty Mountain Hop" and "In the Light", recorded in 2000.

Bassist Sven Pipien, who was fired between the two different releases of the album, was airbrushed out of the group shot that features in the centrefold of the TVT Records version and all subsequent vinyl reissues. The original image appears on the musicmaker.com CD and can also be seen on a Jimmy Page blog.

Track listing
TVT version

musicmaker.com version 

Disc one
"Heartbreaker" (Bonham, Jones, Page, Plant) – 6:03
"In My Time of Dying" (Traditional; arr./adap. Bonham, Jones, Page, Plant) – 9:45
"What Is and What Should Never Be" (Page, Plant) – 5:31
"Custard Pie" (Page, Plant) – 5:26
"Celebration Day" (Jones, Page, Plant) – 3:38
"Out on the Tiles" / "Whole Lotta Love" (Medley) (Bonham, Page, Plant / Bonham, Dixon, Jones, Page, Plant) – 9:12
"Nobody's Fault but Mine" (Page, Plant) – 6:52
"You Shook Me" (Dixon, Lenoir) – 8:29

Disc two
"The Lemon Song" (Bonham, Wolf, Jones, Page, Plant) – 9:01
"Your Time Is Gonna Come" (Jones, Page) – 6:01
"Ten Years Gone" (Page, Plant) – 6:38
"Sick Again" (Page, Plant) – 4:39
"Hey Hey What Can I Do" (Bonham, Jones, Page, Plant) – 3:39
"Shake Your Money Maker" (James) – 4:31
"Woke Up This Morning" (King, Taub) – 4:19
"Shapes of Things to Come" (McCarty, Relf, Samwell-Smith) – 3:18
"Sloppy Drunk" (Rogers) – 6:07
"Oh Well" (Green) – 4:24

Personnel
The Black Crowes

Chris Robinson – vocals
Rich Robinson – guitar, vocals
Audley Freed – guitar
Sven Pipien – bass
Steve Gorman – drums
Eddie Harsch – keyboards
Greg Rzab – bass (bonus tracks only)

with

 Jimmy Page – electric guitar, acoustic guitar

Production

 Kevin Shirley – production, mixing
Butch Belair – photography
Ian R. Drury – inside booklet design
J.C. & A.F. – art direction and design
George Marino – mastering at Sterling Sound, New York
Joe Newton – cover illustration
 Leonard B. Johnson - A&R

Accolades

Charts

Album (digital download)

Certifications

References

2000 live albums
Albums produced by Kevin Shirley
Albums recorded at the Greek Theatre (Los Angeles)
Live blues rock albums
Collaborative albums
Covers albums
Jimmy Page albums
Led Zeppelin tribute albums
The Black Crowes live albums
TVT Records live albums